Stephanos Geevarghese (born Geevarghese Kuttiparichel on 8 February 1978) is a Syriac Orthodox archbishop of Simhasana Churches in the Malabar Region.

Education

 Bachelor of Divinity from M.S.O.T. Seminary, Udayagiri
 Doctor of Divinity from Teologiska Högskolan Västerbotten Sweden

Books
Geevarghese has authored books including Chiriyude Chirathukal, Visudha Vicharangal etc.

Organ donation
In association with Kidney Federation of India, founded by Davis Chiramel, Geevarghese who was aged 39 years, donated his kidney to a Muslim woman who was suffering from kidney ailments.

References

External links
 Sthephanos Geevarghese

1978 births
Living people
Syriac Orthodox Church bishops
Indian Oriental Orthodox Christians